The Book of Margery Kempe is a medieval text attributed to Margery Kempe, an English Christian mystic and pilgrim who lived at the turn of the fifteenth century. It details Kempe's life, her travels, her alleged experiences of divine revelation including her visions of interacting with the Trinity, particularly Jesus, as well as other biblical figures. These interactions take place through a strong, mental connection forged between Kempe and said biblical figures. The book is also notable for her claiming to be present at key biblical events such as the Nativity, shown in chapter six of Book I,  and the Crucifixion.

Content
Kempe's book is written in the third person, employing the phrase "this creature" when referring to Kempe in order to display humility before God, via the distancing from her self by abandoning the first-person narrative form. It is structured into two "books" totaling 6047 lines; the first book containing 5246 lines and the second book consisting of 801 lines.   Kempe claimed to be illiterate and her book was dictated to two scribes who set it down. Modern editions of Kempe's book are based on a manuscript copied by a scribe named Salthows sometime in the fifteenth century (the original manuscript has been lost). Recent research by Anthony Bale has suggested that Salthows was one Richard Salthouse, a monk at Norwich’s cathedral priory. The Salthows manuscript, then owned by Colonel W. Butler-Bowdon, was found in a country-house in Derbyshire in the early 1930s, and was identified as Margery Kempe’s book by Hope Emily Allen, who was instrumental in the publication of the second modern edition of the text. The manuscript was purchased by the British Library from Captain Maurice E. Butler Bowdon (1910-1984) at an auction held by Sotheby's in London on 24 June 1980.

Prior to the discovery of the full text, all that was known of Kempe's book were pamphlets published by Wynkyn de Worde in 1501 and Henry Pepwell in 1521 which contained excerpts from The Book of Margery Kempe. Kempe's book is widely cited as the first autobiography in English; however, scholars disagree on whether it can accurately be called an autobiography, or whether it would be more accurately classified as a confession of faith or autohagiography. There has been some discussion about conceptualizing Margery Kempe as a character or persona instead of treating the book as purely autobiographical, similar to how Geoffrey Chaucer as an author differs from Chaucer the character in The Canterbury Tales.

Manuscript features
The Book of Margery Kempe currently belongs to the British Library. The manuscript has been digitized and can can be viewed online.  Written in Gothic Cursive hand, it consists of 124 folio pages, measuring 205 x 140mm. Four distinct hands have been identified writing annotations and making illustrations within the marginalia of the manuscript, the most recognizable script being one made in red ink.  It could be concluded through the effort of making of these annotations that Kempe's book was frequently used and valued as a text, perhaps its contents viewed with admiration for its religious fervor. The underlining and highlighting by various hands demonstrates the aspects of her text that are valued, perhaps even to draw away from Kempe's more radical and disruptive facets.

Manuscript, modern editions and translations
"British Library Catalogue: Add. MS 61823: The Book of Margery Kempe". London: British Library. Retrieved 12 July 2016.
Kempe, Margery. The Book of Margery Kempe, ed. Sanford Brown Meech, with prefatory note by Hope Emily Allen (EETS. Original series; no. 212). London: Oxford University Press, 1940.
Kempe, Margery. The Book of Margery Kempe, trans. Barry Windeatt. Harmondsworth: Penguin, 1985.
Kempe, Margery. The Book of Margery Kempe: The Autobiography of the Wild Woman of God, trans. Tony D. Triggs. Barnhart: Liguori Publications, 1995; Tunbridge Wells: Burns and Oates, 1995.
Kempe, Margery. The Book of Margery Kempe, ed. Lynn Staley. Kalamazoo:  Medieval Institute Publications, 1996.
Kempe, Margery. The Book of Margery Kempe: A New Translation, trans. John Skinner. New York: Image Books/Doubleday, 1998.
Kempe, Margery. The Book of Margery Kempe: A New Translation, Contexts and Criticism, trans. and ed., Lynn Staley. New York: Norton, 2001.
Kempe, Margery. The Book of Margery Kempe, trans. Anthony Bale. Oxford: Oxford University Press, 2015

References

External links

1430s  books
15th-century Christian texts
1501 books
British autobiographies
Religious autobiographies
Pilgrimage accounts